Yaksu Station is a subway station on the Seoul Subway Line 3 and Line 6 in Jung-gu, Seoul.

Station layout

Overview
Yaksu area is a largely residential area. Around the station, there are many shops such as Dunkin' Donuts, STCO (Shop selling men's clothes) and cafés. Several grocery stores and the Yaksu post office are also near. It is also close to Dongguk University station and the school.

References 

Seoul Metropolitan Subway stations
Metro stations in Jung District, Seoul
Railway stations in South Korea opened in 1985
Seoul Subway Line 3
Seoul Subway Line 6